Wittrockia is a genus of plants in the family Bromeliaceae, subfamily Bromelioideae.

The genus name is for Veit Brecher Wittrock, a Swedish botanist (1839-1914).

These plants are native to Central America and South America.  Many species are endemic to the Atlantic Forest biome (Mata Atlantica Brasileira), located in southeastern Brazil.

Description
Wittrockia is large among bromeliad genera, producing long, glossy leaves armed with sharp spines.  Forming rosettes over 1 meter in diameter, the foliage may contain various colors of spots and banding, depending on species.

Their inflorescence blooms deep in the vase where the plant catches water.

Species 
 Wittrockia cyathiformis (Vellozo) Leme
 Wittrockia flavipetala (Wand.) Leme & H.Luther
 Wittrockia gigantea (Baker) Leme 
 Wittrockia paulistana Leme 
 Wittrockia spiralipetala Leme 
 Wittrockia superba Lindman 
 Wittrockia tenuisepala (Leme) Leme

Cultivation
Wittrockia species are adaptable to varying climates and light exposure.  Their attractive foliage has made them popular in cultivation as an ornamental plant.

References

External links
Florida Council of Bromeliad Societies - Wittrockia Photos
BSI Genera Gallery Wittrockia Photos

 
Flora of Brazil
Flora of Central America
Flora of South America
Bromeliaceae genera